Fucus spiralis is a species of seaweed, a brown alga (Heterokontophyta, Phaeophyceae), living on the littoral shore of the Atlantic coasts of Europe and North America. It has the common names of spiral wrack and flat wrack.

Description
Fucus spiralis is olive brown in colour and similar to Fucus vesiculosus and Fucus serratus. It grows to about 30 cm long and branches somewhat irregularly dichotomous and is attached, generally to rock, by a discoid holdfast. The flattened blade has a distinct mid-rib and is usually spirally twisted without a serrated edge, as in Fucus serratus, and it does not show air-vesicles, as Fucus vesiculosus.

Life history
The reproductive bodies form rounded swollen tips on the branches, usually in pairs.
In the conceptacles oögonia and antheridia are produced after meiosis and then released. Fertilisation follows and the zygote develops directly into the diploid sporophyte plant.

Ecology
The other common species of Fucus on the coasts of British Isles: Fucus spiralis, Fucus vesiculosus and Fucus serratus along with Ascophyllum nodosum form the main and dominant seaweeds on rocky shores. These three species, along with two others Pelvetia canaliculata and Ascophyllum nodosum form the zones along the shore.

Distribution
F. spiralis is common on the coasts all around the British Isles, western coasts of Europe, Canary Islands and North-eastern America.

Chemistry
Fucus spiralis produces phlorotannins of both the fucol and fucophlorethol types.

See also
 Fucus vesiculosus
 Fucus serratus

References

External links

Biota of the Atlantic Ocean
Edible algae
Species described in 1753
Taxa named by Carl Linnaeus
Fucaceae